CopSSH is an implementation of OpenSSH for Windows. CopSSH offers both SSH client and server functionality and can be used for remote administration of Windows systems. CopSSH contains Cygwin DLLs and a compiled version of OpenSSH on Cygwin. An administration GUI is also provided as of version 4.0.0.

History 

The first version of CopSSH was developed to address the requirements of Logrep and was published as a free solution on the SecurityFocus Secure Shell mailing list. CopSSH became popular  and is kept updated with newer versions of its underlying solutions.

Features 

The CopSSH client can be used to initiate SSH/SFTP/SCP connections, while the CopSSH server is used as the SSH or SFTP server.

CopSSH administration GUI has the following features:

 Service, connection, and event status
 User Access Control with activation wizard
 Public Key Administration with PKA wizard
 SSH Server Configuration
 SFTP Server Configuration

See also 
 OpenSSH
 Secure File Transfer Protocol

References

External links
 

Internet Protocol based network software